Kjell Eldensjö (born 1941) is a Swedish Christian Democratic politician. He was a member of the Riksdag from 1991 to 2010 with taking breaks between 1994 and 1998 and 2002 to 2006. He is also an engineer.

External links
Kjell Eldensjö at the Riksdag website

Members of the Riksdag from the Christian Democrats (Sweden)
Living people
1941 births
Members of the Riksdag 1991–1994
Members of the Riksdag 1998–2002
Members of the Riksdag 2006–2010
20th-century Swedish politicians
21st-century Swedish politicians